Erick Alejandro Rivera  (born 10 October 1989) is a Salvadoran professional footballer who plays as a forward in Aurora.

Club career

Aurora
On 6 January 2020, Rivera was signed to Bolivian club Aurora. 
He made his Aurora debut in January 2020 in a 4–0 win over Real Potosi, he would end up scoring a goal in his third game against Jorge Wilstermann. He would make 12 appearances and score 3 goals, before the season was suspended due to the COVID-19 Pandemic.

On 10 June 2020, he signed a one-year contract extension to remain in Bolivia.

On 15 August 2022, Rivera was banned from all football until October 5, 2025 due to testing positive for clostebol – a synthetic derivative of a muscle-building steroid that the body naturally produces in larger amounts in men  – following after a 3-0 loss to Canada on September 8, 2021

Honours

Club
 Santa Tecla F.C.
 Copa El Salvador  (1) :  2018–19

Individual

References

External links

Erick Rivera at playmakerstats.com (English version of ceroacero.es)

1989 births
Living people
Salvadoran footballers
Salvadoran expatriate footballers
C.D. Juventud Independiente players
C.D. FAS footballers
Santa Tecla F.C. footballers
Club Aurora players
El Salvador international footballers
Bolivian Primera División players
Salvadoran expatriates in Bolivia
Expatriate footballers in Bolivia
Association football forwards
People from Santa Tecla, El Salvador